Lydia T. Black (December 16, 1925 – March 12, 2007) was an American anthropologist. 
She won an American Book Award for Russians in Tlingit America: The Battles of Sitka, 1802 And 1804.

Life
She grew up in Kyiv. Her father was executed in 1933, and her mother died of tuberculosis in 1941. During World War II, she was sent to a German forced labor camp. After the war, in Munich, she was a janitor. She was enlisted by the Americans as a translator, at the United Nations Relief and Rehabilitation Administration displaced children's camp, since she could speak six languages. 
She married Igor Black, and immigrated in 1950.

She graduated from Brandeis University with a B.A., and M.A. in 1971, and University of Massachusetts Amherst with a Ph.D. in 1973. 
She taught at Providence College beginning in 1973. She taught at the University of Alaska Fairbanks from 1984 to 1998. She worked translating and cataloging the Russian archives of Saint Herman's Orthodox Theological Seminary, earning the Cross of St. Herman.
In April 2001, she, along with fellow anthropologist and historian and close colleague Richard Pierce, historians Barbara Sweetland Smith, John Middleton-Tidwell, and Viktor Petrov (posthumous), was decorated by the Russian Federation with the Order of Friendship Medal, which they received at the Russian consulate in San Francisco.

She is buried at Kodiak City Cemetery.

Family
She married Igor A. Black (died 1969), an engineer for NASA contractors; they had four daughters.

Works

References

External links
Dr Lydia Black documents

1925 births
2007 deaths
American women anthropologists
Writers from Kyiv
People from Kodiak, Alaska
Soviet emigrants to the United States
University of Alaska Fairbanks faculty
Writers from Alaska
20th-century American women scientists
20th-century American scientists
American Book Award winners
20th-century American anthropologists
American women academics
21st-century American women